Everton de Viña del Mar is a Chilean football club based in the city of Viña del Mar.

The club was founded 24 June 1909 after a group of Anglo-Chilean teenagers formed a football club and named it after the English team Everton who had recently completed a pioneering tour of South America.

The club's nickname is "Ruleteros" or the roulette players in English, after Viña del Mar's status as a gambling resort.

Everton is Chile's sixth most successful team, having won the national title 4 times, an achievement shared with both Audax Italiano and Magallanes. Additionally, it is the second most successful team outside Santiago de Chile, behind Cobreloa of Calama.

The club's home stadium is the 22,340 capacity Estadio Sausalito, while its biggest rival is Santiago Wanderers of Valparaíso. In the meetings between the two clubs, Everton have won 64 to 49 losses.

History

Foundation and Amateur Era
On 24 June 1909, a group of immigrants from England, led by David Foxley, founded Everton Football Club in Cerro Alegre of Valparaíso. The choice of this name is still to this day a mystery, although there are various competing theories. The most accepted theory is that this was chosen in honour of the namesake club in the city of Liverpool, which was, by then, touring Argentina. Another theory states the name of a toffee at the time. The first president was Francisco Boundy, while David Foxley was appointed honorary chairman. In 1950 the club was renamed Everton de Viña del Mar.

The first match played was against Graphie FC with the starting lineup composed of Arturo Foxley as the goalkeeper, Percy Holmes and Francisco Boundy as the defenders; Alberto González, Hugo Boundy and Carlos González as the midfielders and finally J. Escobar, A. Aravena, David Foxley, V. Estay and Malcolm Fraser as the strikers.

Originally the club was a compendium of different sports, the most important being track and field, human swimming, badminton, rugby, gymnastics, basketball and football.

Everton's first championship participation was the 1912 amateur championship of the Liga de Valparaíso.

The Golden age

Everton's first championship win was in 1950 under the Argentine coach Martín García. They defeated Unión Española 1–0 away in a play-off on 14 January 1951. The lone goal was scored by René Meléndez in the Estadio Nacional de Chile before 45,000 spectators.

In 1951, Everton finished the league in fourth, 5 points behind Audax Italiano. The following year, Everton clinched the Primera División with two weeks to spare, as Martín García's side beat Audax Italiano 4–0 at home win. In the championship-winning squad the most prominent players were José María Lourido, Elías Cid and René Meléndez, top-scorer of the tournament with 30 goals. During this period the club also won against important clubs of South America, the most recorded match was against the Argentine club Independiente of Avellaneda, in a 5–0 home win at Estadio El Tranque with 12,000 spectators.

The performance of the club began to decline, and apart from a third-place finish in 1955, Everton's highest finish for the remainder of the 1950s would be sixth position in the 12-team league.

1970-present
After many years of revolving between the Primera División and the 2nd tier the club finally clinched their third Primera División championship in the 1976 Primera División under the guidance of manager Pedro Morales. They have won the 2nd division championship on two occasions, the first in 1974 and most recently in 2003. The club has played in 2 Copa Libertadores tournaments, the first came in 1977 after their Primera División 1976 championship.

In Torneo Apertura 2007 the club ended in 12th position, but in the Torneo Clausura the club made the worst campaign in its history ended in last position (21st).

In the Torneo Apertura 2008 Everton was proclaimed champion of the tournament, with a 3–2 aggregate result against Colo-Colo in Estadio Sausalito. In the first leg Everton lost 2–0 away at the Estadio Monumental David Arellano with goals by Lucas Barrios and Gonzalo Fierro but in the second home leg at the Estadio Sausalito Everton won 3–0 with two goals by Ezequiel Miralles and one from Jaime Riveros. In thanks to that tournament win in 2009 Everton qualified for the Copa Libertadotes, for the second time in their history.

On 4 August 2010 at Goodison Park in Liverpool England, Everton de Viña del Mar for the first time played the club they were named in honour of, their namesakes Everton. In a friendly match for the Copa Hermandad (known in English as the Brotherhood Trophy), the match was to promote closer ties between the two Evertons. The match was won 2–0 by the original Everton with goals from Jermaine Beckford and Diniyar Bilyaletdinov. That year Everton de Viña, were relegated to Primera B.

Two seasons later, Everton de Viña featured in the Primera B promotion play-off against Universidad de Concepción, winning the first (home) leg on 18 November 2012 (1–0) with a goal from Angel Rojas. In the away leg on 26 November 2012 two goals from José Luis Muñoz and one from Yonathan Suazo secured a 1–3 win and a return to the top-flight of Chilean football in 2013.

Rivalries
Everton's main rivals are Santiago Wanderers, from the nearby city of Valparaíso. Valparaíso is seen as a historical city with rich culture, home of worldwide known poet Pablo Neruda, whilst Viña del Mar is renowned for being a glamorous and luxurious place full of resorts. The local derby is dubbed the "Clásico Porteño" or "The Seaport Derby" in English.

Stadium

The club's home games are played at the Estadio Sausalito, which has a capacity of 22,340 seats being built in 1929. The name comes from the nearby lagoon Sausalito. The stadium was used as one of the venues for the 1962 FIFA World Cup. The stadium hosted the semi-final between Czechoslovakia and Yugoslavia. It was also one of four venues to host matches during the 1991 Copa América and 2015 Copa América.

Honours
Primera División: 4
1950, 1952, 1976, 2008 Apertura

Copa Chile: 1
1984

Primera B: 1
2003

Copa Apertura Segunda División: 1
1982

Primera B Clausura: 1
2011

Club Facts
66 Seasons in Primera División
14 Seasons in Primera B
3 Participations in Copa Libertadores (1977, 2009, 2022)
3 Participations in Copa Sudamericana (2017, 2018, 2022)

South American cups history

Records
Record Primera División victory — 7–0 v. Bádminton (1946) & Iberia (1954)
Record Primera División defeat — 1–8 v. Universidad de Chile (1962) & Universidad Católica (1994)
Record Copa Chile victory — 8–0 v. Selección Copiapó (1961)
Record victory (overall) — 17–0 v. Santiago Wanderers (Campeonato de Apertura 1950)
Most goals scored (Primera División matches) — 123, Daniel Escudero (1962–1966, 1968–1972)
Highest home attendance  — 30,002 v. Colo-Colo (3 October 1976) (at Estadio Sausalito)
Primera División Best Position  — Champions (1950, 1952, 1976, 2008 A)
Copa Chile Best Season  — Champions (1984)

Other sports
Originally the club, was a compendium of various sport disciplines, emphasizing athletics, swimming, badminton, rugby, gymnastics and basketball, which gave way to football. In the 1920s, future President Salvador Allende was a member of the club and was particularly noted as a long jumper.

Everton also field a women's football team, which has won numerous national championships. They represented Chile at the inaugural Copa Libertadores de Fútbol Femenino in 2009, and also in 2010. In 2009, Everton finished in fourth place behind champions Santos of Brazil; in 2010 they advanced to the final, also against Santos, but lost 1–0.

Brotherhood Cup
The Brotherhood Cup was a one-off match on 4 August 2010 at Goodison Park in Liverpool. Everton de Viña del Mar played their namesakes Everton in a friendly match for the Copa Hermandad (known in English as the Brotherhood Trophy). The match aimed at promoting closer ties between the two Evertons. Everton (ENG) won the game 2–0 with two second half goals from Jermaine Beckford and Diniyar Bilyaletdinov. Beckford won the man of the match award. And the trophy was held up by Phil Neville and Mikel Arteta. It was the first time the two teams had ever played each other.

Joint Everton War Memorial
In June 2011 the Everton Shareholders' Association unveiled a joint war memorial at Goodison Park commemorating members of both clubs who gave their lives in the World Wars.

Current squad

2021 Winter Transfers

In

Out

Notable players

  Maximiliano Cerato
  Gustavo Dalsasso
 Ezequiel Miralles
 José Daniel Ponce
 Matías Urbano
 Rafael Viotti
 Ramiro Castillo
 Milton Melgar
 Rubens Nicola
 Sergio Ahumada
 Mario Barreto
 Ivo Basay
 Mario Cáceres
 Alejandro Carrasco
 Cristián Castañeda
 Roberto Elías Cid
 Marco Cornez
 Juan Covarrubias
 Mauricio Donoso
 Marco Estrada
 Mario Galindo
 Johnny Herrera
 Belisario Leiva
 René Meléndez
 Manuel Neira
 Álvaro Ormeño
 René Piérola
 Renato Ramos
 Jaime Riveros
 Eladio Rojas
 César Santis
  Jorge Spedaletti
 Carlos Toro
 Casimiro Torres
 Cristián Uribe
  Oscar Wirth
 Luis Alberto Perea
 Pablo Caballero
 Marco Lazaga
  Nelson Acosta
 Jorge Delgado
 Carlos María Morales
 Braian Rodríguez
 Noah Phelan (Academy)

Managers

 Pedro Morales (1976–78)
 Hugo Tassara (1980)
 Francisco Molina (1981)
 Caupolicán Peña (1981–82)
 Fernando Riera (1983–84)
 Orlando Aravena (1986)
 Luis Santibáñez (1992)
 Jorge Garcés (1993)
 Gerardo Pelusso (1998)
 Jorge Luis Siviero (1999–00)
 Jorge Aravena (2000)
 Jorge Luis Siviero (2002)
 Hernán Ibarra (1 July 2002 – 30 June 2003)
 Jorge Socías (2003–04)
 Jorge Garcés (2004–05)
 Marcelo "Cabezón" Espina (2006)
 Juvenal Olmos (2006–07)
 Nelson Acosta (1 Aug 2007 – 19 October 2010)
 Diego Osella (19 Oct 2010 – 16 December 2011)
 Marco Antonio Figueroa (2 May 2011 – 3 May 2012)
 Víctor Hugo Castañeda (3 May 2012 – 6 October 2013)
 Omar Labruna (2013 – 16 January 2014)
 Nelson Acosta (17 Jan 2014–14)
 Luis Marcoleta (2014)
 Carlos Medina (28 Oct 2014–14)
 Victor Rivero (2015–16)
 Cristián Uribe (2016)
 Héctor Tapia (2016–)

References

External links

 

 
Football clubs in Chile
Association football clubs established in 1909
Sport in Valparaíso Region
1909 establishments in Chile